Lac du Campana is a lake in Hautes-Pyrénées, France. At an elevation of 2225 m, its surface area is 0.08 km².

Lakes of Hautes-Pyrénées